Young Man Smoking a Pipe is a painting by the Flemish artist Michaelina Wautier. It was painted in 1656. The content is possibly part of a series related to the five senses, with the pipe smoker in the painting representing the sense of smell.

The painting is in the private collection of Bijl-Van Urk B.V.

References 

Paintings by Michaelina Wautier
1656 paintings